Leon Raymond Dombrowski (April 9, 1938 – September 5, 1998) was an American football linebacker who played for one season in the American Football League (AFL). He played in one game for the New York Titans in 1960 after playing college football for the Delaware Fightin' Blue Hens. He was named to the All-East weekly college football team for his performance on October 24, 1959.

References

1938 births
1998 deaths
Players of American football from Wilmington, Delaware
American football linebackers
Delaware Fightin' Blue Hens football players
New York Titans (AFL) players
Salesianum School alumni